"The Ultimate Showdown of Ultimate Destiny", often shortened to "The Ultimate Showdown", is a comical song and video released on December 22, 2005. The song was written and performed by Neil Cicierega under the pseudonym "Lemon Demon", with art and Flash animation by Shawn Vulliez/altffour.

Music video

"The Ultimate Showdown" is a massive, citywide battle set in Tokyo started by Godzilla and Batman, ultimately lasting for a century and involving dozens of pop-culture icons, fictional and otherwise, ending with Mr. Rogers emerging victorious and then committing seppuku. It gained a large cult following among web enthusiasts and became the "User's Choice" on December 28, 2005, on Newgrounds, where it has been viewed over 13.2 million times. It appeared on several other websites including Albino Blacksheep, YouTube, Flashportal, Transbuddha, and Weebl's Stuff. In 2006 it was included on Lemon Demon's fifth album Dinosaurchestra. It had over 25 million views on YouTube as of November 2020. A higher resolution fan upload has received over 4.5 million views on YouTube as of January 2023.

The song topped the "Funny Five" on The Dr. Demento Show for several weeks and was the #1 Request for 2006. The video has since been parodied and referenced repeatedly in other flash videos. A new version of the song was later recorded specifically for the Rock Band Network and was released for the service on July 6, 2010, under the title The Ultimate Showdown (RBN Mix). In 2009, the song was rerecorded with a full band, and this track was included in Lemon Demon's 2011 EP "Live (Only Not)".

In early January 2021, the original music video on YouTube was taken down by Shawn Vulliez, the original animator of the short. He would go on to reupload the music video to his own channel 'Srsly Wrong'.

Plot 
As Godzilla is going on a rampage through Tokyo, Batman suddenly hits him with a Bat-Grenade. As Godzilla attacks his new foe, Shaquille O'Neal and Aaron Carter join the fight, but are run over by the Batmobile. Unfortunately, before Batman can return to the Batcave, Abraham Lincoln rises from the dead and shoots Batman with an AK-47. Lincoln is then forced to flee by Optimus Prime.

After Godzilla kills Optimus Prime, O’Neal returns “covered in a tire track,” but is then attacked by Jackie Chan. Meanwhile, Lincoln attempts to finish off Batman with a machete, but is stopped by Indiana Jones. However, Jones is left defenseless against Godzilla as Batman steals his gun and unsuccessfully attempts to kill Chan. A somersaulting Chan and a pole-vaulting Lincoln then collide in the air, and are killed by a Care Bear Stare.

Chuck Norris then descends from heaven, and proceeds to kick Jones in the groin and kill Batman by crushing his head in between his thighs. However, Gandalf the Grey, Gandalf the White, the Black Knight, Benito Mussolini, the Blue Meanie, Cowboy Curtis, Jambi the Genie, RoboCop, the Terminator, Captain Kirk, Darth Vader, Lo Pan, Superman, every single Power Ranger, Bill S. Preston, Theodore Logan, Spock, Dwayne "The Rock" Johnson, Doc Ock, and Hulk Hogan suddenly arrive and kill Norris.

A century later, the battle has finally ended, with only one contestant remaining: Mr. Rogers, who commits seppuku.

Characters

Notes and references

External links

Lemon Demon official website
"The Ultimate Showdown" on Newgrounds

Comedy songs
Novelty songs
Crossover animation
Internet memes introduced in 2005
2005 songs
2005 animated films
Animated music videos
Tokyo in fiction
Cultural depictions of Chuck Norris
Cultural depictions of Hulk Hogan
Cultural depictions of Jackie Chan
Cultural depictions of Benito Mussolini
Cultural depictions of Abraham Lincoln
Parodies of Batman
Parodies of Star Trek
Parodies of Superman
Star Wars parodies